René Lécuron (26 April 1909 – 23 June 1985) was a French long-distance runner. He competed in the men's 5000 metres at the 1936 Summer Olympics.

References

1909 births
1985 deaths
Athletes (track and field) at the 1936 Summer Olympics
French male long-distance runners
Olympic athletes of France
Place of birth missing
20th-century French people